The commander of the PLA Air Force is the commanding officer of the People's Liberation Army Air Force (PLAAF). The current commander is Chang Dingqiu.

List of commanders

References